Players and pairs who neither have high enough rankings nor receive wild cards may participate in a qualifying tournament held one week before the annual Wimbledon Tennis Championships.

Seeds

  Victor Hănescu (qualifying competition, lucky loser)
  Kristof Vliegen (first round)
  Dick Norman (qualified)
  Ricardo Mello (second round)
  Nicolas Thomann (first round)
  Fernando Verdasco (qualified)
  Cyril Saulnier (qualified)
  Robert Kendrick (qualifying competition, lucky loser)
  Grégory Carraz (second round)
  Michaël Llodra (qualified)
  Iván Miranda (first round)
  Peter Luczak (first round)
  Ivo Heuberger (qualified)
  Jérôme Golmard (withdrew)
  Julian Knowle (first round)
  Cecil Mamiit (second round)
  Andrei Stoliarov (first round)
  Wesley Moodie (qualified)
  Igor Kunitsyn (qualifying competition, lucky loser)
  Tomáš Zíb (qualifying competition, lucky loser)
  George Bastl (first round)
  Julien Varlet (first round)
  Stefano Galvani (qualifying competition, lucky loser)
  Eric Taino (first round)
  Noam Okun (qualifying competition)
  Robin Söderling (qualified)
  Hermes Gamonal (first round)
  Alex Kim (first round)
  Marcelo Charpentier (first round)
  Gilles Elseneer (qualified)
  Paul Goldstein (first round)
  Vadim Kutsenko (first round)

Qualifiers

  Konstantinos Economidis
  Ivo Karlović
  Dick Norman
  Wesley Moodie
  Petr Luxa
  Fernando Verdasco
  Cyril Saulnier
  Frédéric Niemeyer
  Paul Baccanello
  Michaël Llodra
  Robin Söderling
  Todd Larkham
  Ivo Heuberger
  Takao Suzuki
  Gilles Elseneer
  Michal Mertiňák

Lucky losers

  Victor Hănescu
  Robert Kendrick
  Igor Kunitsyn
  Tomáš Zíb
  Stefano Galvani

Qualifying draw

First qualifier

Second qualifier

Third qualifier

Fourth qualifier

Fifth qualifier

Sixth qualifier

Seventh qualifier

Eighth qualifier

Ninth qualifier

Tenth qualifier

Eleventh qualifier

Twelfth qualifier

Thirteenth qualifier

Fourteenth qualifier

Fifteenth qualifier

Sixteenth qualifier

External links

 2003 Wimbledon Championships – Men's draws and results at the International Tennis Federation

Men's Singles Qualifying
Wimbledon Championship by year – Men's singles qualifying